New Galician Left (NEG, Nova Esquerda Galega in Galician language) is a Galician left-wing political organization.

History
NEG was formed in 2013 by former members of Galician Left Unity (UEG) and the entire membership of New Socialist Left (NES). Both groups had been part of Anova-Nationalist Brotherhood since its foundation. This organization, formed through the merger of the two small parties, was also joined by about twenty ex-members of the Galician Socialist Party (PSdeG).

Currently the party is in a relationship of ongoing collaboration with organizations like Open Left (Izab), Convergence for Extremadura (CEX), Ezker Batua-Berdeak (EB-B), Compromís, Plural Space and Socialist Left Initiative (ISI) and is part of the left-wing coalition La Izquierda, that advocates the creation, for the future elections, of a left front that could break the two-party system in Spain.

Óscar Álvarez Lomba and Lois Pérez Leira are the two spokespersons of the party.

References

External links
Official website 

Socialist parties in Galicia (Spain)
Secessionist organizations in Europe
Galician nationalist parties
Left-wing nationalist parties